The Preston Cenotaph stands in Market Square, Preston, Lancashire, England, and is a monument to soldiers from Preston who perished in World War I and II.  Unveiled on 13 June 1926, the memorial was designed by Sir Giles Gilbert Scott with sculptural work by Henry Alfred Pegram.

The monument
The monument's main feature is a figure of “Victory” whose arms are raised and who holds laurel wreaths in either hand. The figure stands within columns supporting a pediment and on either side of the “Victory” figure are representations of those who died said to be “pleading for acceptance of their sacrifice”.  At the very top of the monument there is an empty coffin (hence “cenotaph” or “empty tomb”) with cherubs and strands of foliage carved around it. There are flagpoles on either side of the monument.  The memorial was unveiled on 13 June 1926 by Admiral of the Fleet Earl Jellicoe of Scapa.

The main inscription reads:

The names of those World War I servicemen honoured are contained in a Roll of Honour located in the Harris Museum. This Roll of Honour is inscribed on marble tablets on the ground floor of the building. The names of some 2,000 Prestonians are thus recorded Details of seven people whose names were omitted from the original listings were discovered and a framed document recording their names was installed in 1998.

No Roll of Honour was produced for those who lost their lives in the Second World War but the Cenotaph remembers the deceased of both World Wars.

2012 restoration
In 2012 the Cenotaph was restored. The work, at a cost of £835,600, was finished in the Autumn and included the carving of a new dedication to the people of the city who lost their lives in service since 1945. As part of Preston’s commemorations of the start of the World War I, it was re-dedicated in a service on 13 June, exactly 88 years since the original unveiling.

On 23 November 2013 it became the focal point of a projection event designed by international artist Andy McKeown. Funded by Arts Council England, the work drew from the collections of the Harris Museum and the Lancashire Infantry Museum. Highlighting some of the stories and faces of the men who lost their lives in World War I, the work projected all the names on the roll of honour directly onto the Cenotaph.

Gallery

See also

Listed buildings in Preston, Lancashire
Grade I listed war memorials in England

Notes

References

Further reading
 Boorman, Derek. (1988). At the Going Down of the Sun: British First World War I Memorials. pp. 139–140.

External links

 Harris Museum

British military memorials and cemeteries
Buildings and structures in Preston
World War I memorials in England
World War II memorials in England
Cenotaphs in the United Kingdom
Monuments and memorials in Lancashire
Grade I listed buildings in Lancashire
Grade I listed monuments and memorials